Júlio César Czarneski (born 12 August 1994), known as Júlio César, is a Brazilian footballer who plays as a forward for Criciúma.

Career statistics

References

External links

1994 births
Living people
Sportspeople from Paraná (state)
Brazilian footballers
Association football forwards
Campeonato Brasileiro Série A players
Campeonato Brasileiro Série B players
Campeonato Brasileiro Série D players
Primeira Liga players
Paraná Clube players
ABC Futebol Clube players
Esporte Clube Internacional players
FC Cascavel players
Sociedade Esportiva e Recreativa Caxias do Sul players
Oeste Futebol Clube players
Associação Chapecoense de Futebol players
Atlético Clube Goianiense players
Associação Atlética Ponte Preta players
Botafogo Futebol Clube (SP) players
Portimonense S.C. players
Brazilian expatriate footballers
Expatriate footballers in Portugal
Brazilian people of Polish descent